Opigena is a genus of moths of the family Noctuidae.

Species
 Opigena polygona ([Schiffermüller], 1775)

References
Natural History Museum Lepidoptera genus database
Opigena at funet

Noctuinae